The Return of the Clerkenwell Kid is an album by The Real Tuesday Weld, released in 2005.

Track listing
"Waking Up" – 0:34
"Anything But Love" – 3:30
"On Lavender Hill" – 3:54
"At the House of the Clerkenwell Kid" – 3:28
"L'amour et la morte" – 4:11
"Bruises" – 1:35
"Turn on the Sun Again" – 3:37
"Close Your Eyes When You Read This" – 1:24
"Daisies" – 4:17
"Something Beautiful" – 5:17
"Déjà Vu" – 2:06
"The Birds and the Bees" – 4:00
"Little White Birds" – 2:35
"I Love the Rain" – 4:13
"Asteroids" – 4:17
"Am I in Love?" – 3:42
"Goodbye Stephen" – 3:29

2005 albums
Six Degrees Records albums
The Real Tuesday Weld albums